Time Doctor is a SaaS employee monitoring tool launched by the owners of Staff.com in 2012.  It includes keystroke logging, screenshot and internet usage tracking features.
A multi-functional employee monitoring application with CRM and white label capabilities.

Features

Time Doctor offers screenshot software, website and application tracking, chat monitoring, and time-based reporting.

Company

Liam Martin and Rob Rawson are the co-founders of Time Doctor. Time Doctor has over 60 employees in 25 different countries. In March 2015, 3 years after it was launched, Time Doctor exceeded 1 million hours tracked per month in 109 countries.

See also
 Comparison of time tracking software
 Employee monitoring software

References

Further reading
 TheTechReviewer.com: Time Doctor Review – Online Time Tracking & Analysis

Time-tracking software
2012 software
Proprietary software